B. Kwaku Duren (born April 14, 1943; a.k.a., Robert Donaldson Duren and Bob D. Duren) is a controversial African American former lawyer, educator, writer, editor, Black Panther, long-time social, political and community activist; and a former convict who now lives and practices law in South Central Los Angeles. He has run for United States Congress three times and once for Vice President of the United States. As a young man, he spent nearly five years in California prisons for armed robbery. He began reading extensively and taking college classes while incarcerated and after his parole in the fall of 1970, he founded and chaired the National Poor People's Congress. A couple of years later, he and his younger sister, Betty Scott, along with Mary Blackburn and other community activists, founded an alternate school – the Intercommunal Youth Institute (1972–1975) – in Long Beach, California.

In the wake of the shooting death of his sister by a California Highway Patrol officer during a routine traffic stop, Duren helped found and was a co-chair of the Coalition Against Police Abuse (CAPA) from 1975 to 1977. From 1976 to 1981 he was the Coordinator of the Southern California Chapter of the Black Panther Party (SCC/BPP). From 1979 until 1991 he worked for the Los Angeles Legal Aid Foundation, beginning as a Community Outreach Worker; later, as a paralegal and attorney; he was one of the founding members and first president of the Union of Legal Services Workers of Los Angeles (AFL-CIO/UAW).

Duren attended law school at the Peoples College of Law in Los Angeles. He graduated in fall of 1989 and was admitted to the California State Bar on August 8, 1990. He has worked as a “people’s” lawyer and community activist in South Central Los Angeles ever since.

A founding member of Community Services Unlimited, Inc., he was its Executive Director from 1977 to 2008. As Chairman of the New Panther Vanguard Movement – since 1994 – Duren was co-editor-in-chief, with his ex-wife, Neelam Sharma, of The Black Panther International News Service, a quarterly newspaper published in Los Angeles from 1995 to 2001.

Early life
B. Kwaku Duren was born in Beckley, West Virginia, the hometown of his father, William Preston “Brack” Duren, and his mother, Willie Wade Bennett. Duren is the only son in a family of four children. His father worked as a miner, a prizefighter, and a steel mill worker.

During the Second World War, when Duren was an infant, his parents moved to Cleveland, Ohio. They lived in various places around Cleveland until settling into some new “housing projects." His mother was a housewife for many years but also worked as a housekeeper and seamstress. When “Brack” Duren had his hand severely mauled in an industrial accident at Midland Steel (he lost two-and-a-half fingers of his right hand), and the company dismissed him with a tiny settlement, Willie Duren was forced to seek work cleaning the houses of whites to help support her family.

In 1959, Duren's mother relocated from Cleveland to Long Beach, California. Her husband followed his family to Long Beach shortly thereafter. In 1960, Brack Duren was arrested in a house raid by the FBI and charged with committing armed robberies of illegal gambling joints in Cleveland, which he had done after being injured and unable to find work. He was extradited to Ohio where he served many years in Chillicothe Correctional Institution before becoming a jailhouse lawyer, doing research on his own case (with the help of his eldest daughter, Joyce), appealing, and ultimately winning his release on a technicality. He rejoined and remarried his wife after his release from prison and lived the remainder of his life in Long Beach.

At the age of 17 years, Kwaku Duren was arrested for breaking and entering into a television shop. He served six months in an L.A. county jail facility before being placed on probation. Following his release he worked in a pool hall in Long Beach, sold drugs, and, with a partner, committed a series of convenience-store holdups over several years. In spring of 1966, he was arrested for sticking up a cab driver, convicted, and sentenced to five years to life. He spent four-and-a-half years in Chino and Soledad prisons. (In a bit of irony, he worked as a cab driver while putting himself through law school.)

During his three-and-a-half years in Soledad, a black counselor introduced Duren to the writings of the African American historian and sociologist W.E.B. Du Bois – especially The World and Africa. Even before his slide into criminality, Duren had been a voracious reader. He thus began an intensive study of African–American history while in prison, reading books such as The Autobiography of Malcolm X. He also devoured works by writers such as J. A. Rogers, Erich Fromm, Friedrich Engels, Karl Marx, and Vladimir Lenin. He ordered these books through the California State Library and the U.N's UNESCO library. One particular area that he devoted himself to was the history of slavery and its effects on, and reverberations in, contemporary life. In addition to his autodidact pursuits, Duren enrolled in and completed classes in economics, sociology, and psychology, as well as astronomy, at San Francisco State University. He was paroled in September 1970 at the age of 27.

The Intercommunal Youth Institute
Duren, his younger sister, Betty Scott (aka Betty Scott-Smith), and other community activists founded the non-profit Intercommunal Youth Institute (IYI) in Long Beach during the summer of 1973. This alternative school, a project of the Experimental Educational Institute, Inc., was organized by Duren and was modeled after the highly successful Black Panther Party community school in Oakland, California. Duren was the Institute Director and taught world history. Betty Scott was the business manager. The IYI received a certification from the state board of education and also received Title I [federal] funds. The IYI's motto, “The World is a Classroom,” captured the school's methodology. As well as giving instruction in the “three Rs”, the IYI strove to teach its students self-awareness strategies to avoid gangs, drugs, and the criminal life.

In the summer of 1975, the Venceremos Brigade chose him to lead a delegation of youth to an international youth summer camp in Cuba to meet with and to discuss youth issues with other students, and to learn about the Cuban Revolution. Upon Duren's return to the U.S., the FBI and INS detained him. He was released after a lengthy interrogation about his purpose for visiting Cuba.

Death of Betty Scott
On September 20, 1975, while on her way to the Monterey Jazz Festival, Betty Scott and her partner, George Smith, were pulled over at 4 a.m. in Pleasanton, California, near Oakland, reportedly for a speeding violation. Ms. Scott was driving. During the stop, two California Highway Patrol officers, Curtis Engberson and Gordon Robbins, approached the car. Engberson was young, a recent recruit to the CHP. He approached Ms. Scott on the driver's side of the vehicle; Robbins took the passenger's side. There is a conflicted claim as to whether the officers had their guns drawn, which would not be routine in a traffic stop. Other details of the subsequent events are disputed as well. What is on record is that Scott was shot once in the neck by Engberson, fell into Smith's lap, and died almost instantly. The shooting was probably without malice – though Engberson and Robbins could still have been held responsible – and occurred as a reaction by the young, nervous officer to Robbins's shout, “She’s got a gun!” Smith did keep a gun in the glove compartment, and Ms. Scott had been reaching into the compartment to produce the car's registration in response to Engberson's order to do so. However, powder burns on the victim's neck, the trajectory of the bullet, other physical evidence, and Smith's account strongly suggested that the police testimony was, in crucial details, a fabrication after the fact in order to diminish culpability. An Alameda County grand jury did exonerate the officers (returning a verdict of justifiable homicide), thereby concurring with the police report that Ms. Scott had pointed the gun at the officer and yet this pistol had somehow managed to fall back into the glove compartment after the officer shot her.

Smith, who had been in the front seat beside Scott, was charged with attempted murder of a police officer, although he did not have a gun in his possession and was in shock due to Scott's shooting. Charges against him were later dropped after a series of demonstrations organized by the Scott-Smith Defense Committee. Off-the-record testimony by another CHP officer to a member of the Duren family stated that the officer who killed Scott subsequently suffered emotional trauma as a result of his action.

Duren and his family, including Duren's first wife, Virginia Harris, and Mary Blackburn formed the Scott-Smith Committee for Justice to investigate the incident and then sued the CHP for three million dollars in a wrongful death suit. The suit was unsuccessful. Following Scott's death, the IYI dissolved.

In February 1976, Duren helped create – along with former Black Panthers Michael Zinzun and Anthony Thigpenn – the Coalition Against Police Abuse (CAPA). Duren became its co-chair. The Coalition, notable for its broad-based alliance between the black and Mexican communities in L.A., had as its purpose to prevent, expose, and resist abuse and misconduct by police, and to seek legal redress for such abuse. Duren has been involved in police abuse and brutality issues ever since the formation of The Scott-Smith Committee for Justice and CAPA.

Citizens Against Police Abuse
In 1981, Kwaku was a founding member and co-chair of the Coalition Against Police Abuse (CAPA), a multi-racial community-based organization with activists in East and Southcentral Los Angeles. He later became a lead plaintiff in the ACLU's domestic spying lawsuit against Los Angeles Police Chief Daryl Gates which sought to eliminate the LAPD's Public Disorder and Intelligence Division (PDID). CAPA, et al. vs. Gates, et al., was settled for $1.3 million and the disbanding of the Public Disorder and Intelligence Division (PDID) and the establishing of the LAPD's Anti-Terrorist Division (ATD).

Black Panther
In the summer of 1976, Duren first enrolled in the Peoples College of Law in Los Angeles. Concurrently, he and some other black activists formed a political study group. He and these activists went to Oakland and met with Elaine Brown, Chairwoman of the Black Panther Party, to discuss reforming the Party in L.A.

In October, nearly a year after his sister's killing, and after meeting with members of the Central Committee of the Party, Duren officially joined the Black Panther Party. In January 1977, while LAPD helicopters circled overhead, Duren inaugurated the new office of the Southern California Chapter of the Black Panther Party (SCC/BPP) on Central Avenue in South Central. He believed that the Party had the potential for raising the consciousness of black youth and others in the continuing struggle for “people’s power.” In the summer of the same year, Huey Newton, who had co-founded the Party in 1966 with Bobby Seale, returned from political exile in Cuba. Late in 1977 Elaine Brown quit the BPP as the result of a conflict with Newton, whose behavior had become increasingly erratic, perhaps due to a power struggle exacerbated by Newton's cocaine use.

Nonetheless, Duren continued to work with the Party, reorganizing the Southern California Chapter, growing its membership, and carrying out its community involvement agenda. However, his strong stand against the use and trafficking of cocaine by Party members apparently put him in conflict with Newton and other members of the BPP leadership.

The re-established SCC under Duren's Coordinator status was always small in member numbers. Duren kept it this way because he felt that many prospective applicants were drawn to the Party more for its public and symbolic role rather than for the serious political agenda that the BPP promulgated. Still, the chapter thrived organizing its “survival programs.” These included martial arts training for youth and adults, a Tutorial/Liberation School Program for youth, and a Seniors Against a Fearful Environment (SAFE) escort program.

David Bryant, an African American, who was an LAPD officer under orders of the then Police Chief, Daryl Gates, illegally infiltrated the SCC. This “domestic spying case” became part of the larger civil rights lawsuit, entitled CAPA vs. Gatesagainst the LAPD, and was settled in 1983. In early 1982 the Oakland BBP leadership decided to disband the BPP, and the leadership of the re-organized SCC, collectively, decided to cease operations. CAPA vs Gates, et al. lawsuit. from

A People’s Lawyer
Duren began taking law classes at the Peoples College of Law (PCL) in August 1976. He dropped out about six months into the program and devoted himself to organizing around police abuse/misconduct issues, resulting in the formation of CAPA, as mentioned above, and the reopening of the SCC/BPP in 1977. In late 1979, he was hired as a Community Outreach Worker by Linda Ferguson, Director of the Watts Legal Aid Office (located at Manchester and Broadway in South Central). When a Legal Assistant opening became available about a year later, he was moved into that position; simultaneously, he took paralegal classes at the University of Southern California's Paralegal Program and received a Certificate of Completion.

Around 1981, Duren started an independent law study program with Linda Ferguson. However, his involvement with CAPA v. Gates split his focus, so he withdrew from the study program.

He returned to the formal study of law by re-enrolling in the PCL in 1985. He graduated in June 1989, received his JD degree, and took the bar for the first time in October 1989. He received confirmation that he had passed in November 1989. The California Committee of Bar Examiners delayed his admission to the state bar as the Subcommittee on Moral Fitness put his attorney application on hold. Duren wrote the State Bar's Governing Board and threatened to sue. He was then admitted and continued to work for legal aid, but as a staff attorney. Duren was sworn in by Judge Richard Paez – at the time a superior court judge who had been a former executive director of Legal Aid – in Paez’ courtroom in 1990. Paez was later appointed as a federal judge.

Duren left Legal Aid for private practice in 1991 due to political pressure from the National Legal Services Corporation in the form of heightened scrutiny of his several campaigns for political office (including running for Congress in 1982 and 1986). There was at the time, and still is, a Congressional prohibition of attorneys employed with Legal Aid running for political office (the legislation that proscribes Legal Aid attorneys running for political office was sponsored by the Republican senator from Utah, Orrin Hatch). In 1993, Duren was certified to practice law in Federal Court and in 1998 certified to practice in the Ninth Circuit Court of Appeals. He was appointed to the Superior Court Arbitration/Mediation Panel in 1997 and to the Federal Court's Settlement Officer Panel and Pilot Prisoner Mediation Program in 2000.

New Panther Vanguard Movement
In 1994 Duran was a founding member and chairman of the New African American Vanguard Movement, which later became the New Panther Vanguard Movement. The organisation was mainly an attempted recreation of the original Black Panther Party but as a response to the heightened racial tensions of the early 1990s being felt in America.

Disbarment

At the age of 70, on May 10, 2013, Duren was given a two-year stayed suspension from the practice of law in the state of California and placed on two years of probation with an actual 30-day suspension. He was also ordered to take the MPRE and to pay restitution.

Duren stipulated that he failed to perform legal services with competence by not showing up at a hearing which led to his client's foreclosure case being dismissed. Duren also did not inform the client of significant developments in her case, failed to promptly refund $10,000 in unearned fees and failed to give her a proper accounting when she asked for a refund. He later, belatedly, returned $2,000 of the fees.
In mitigation, Duren had more than 20 years of discipline-free practice prior to the misconduct, has been involved in numerous pro bono activities and cooperated with the State Bar by entering into a stipulation before trial.
As part of the stipulation, Duren was ordered to pay $8,000, plus interest, to the former client.

On March 12, 2017, the Supreme Court of California disbarred Duren after he failed to participate in State Bar Court proceedings related to three counts of misconduct involving a single client matter, which led the State Bar Court to enter his default. The default meant that the court deemed admitted the factual allegations against Duren.

References

Bibliography
 DeSantis, John. The New Untouchables. Chicago: The Noble Press, Inc. 1994.
 Donner, Frank. Protectors of Privilege: Red Squads and Police Repression in Urban America. Berkeley and Los Angeles: University of California Press, 1990.
 Duren, Joyce. My Bout with Lupus. Duren Enterprises, 1985.
 Duren, Joyce. Profiles in Black. New York: CORE Publications, 1976.
 Escobar, Edward. “The Dialectics of Repression,” in The Journal of American History, March 1993.
 Hunt, Raymond G., and Magenau, John M. Power and the Police Chief. Newbury Park, California; SAGE Publications, 1993.
 Jerger, Burr. “CHP Shoots Black Activist.” Los Angeles Free Press. October 3–9, 1975, p. 9.
 Oakland Tribune. “Woman Shot: Pulled Gun on CHP.” September 21, 1975, p. 1.
 Sharma, Neelam, and Duren, Kwaku, eds. The Black Panther International News Service. Vols. 4, 5, 6, and 7.

1943 births
Activists from West Virginia
African-American educators
African-American lawyers
California lawyers
Disbarred American lawyers
Educators from West Virginia
Living people
Members of the Black Panther Party
People from Beckley, West Virginia
People's College of Law alumni
Activists from California
African-American candidates for Vice President of the United States
1988 United States vice-presidential candidates